Álvaro 'Aldo' Pedro Duscher (born 22 March 1979) is an Argentine retired footballer who played as a defensive midfielder.

Renowned for his physical presence on the pitch, he also held an Austrian passport, and spent most of his professional career in Spain, playing in 338 official matches for four clubs – most notably at Deportivo.

Over 11 seasons, Duscher amassed La Liga totals of 247 games and five goals. He also had a two-year spell in Portugal, with Sporting.

Club career
Born in Esquel, Chubut Province, Duscher made his professional debut in 1996, with Newell's Old Boys. In 1998 the 19-year-old moved to Europe to play with Sporting CP, where he won the Primeira Liga in his second season.

Duscher was then signed by Deportivo de La Coruña, for a price of €13 million. After just five La Liga appearances in his first year he featured more in the following years, as a complement and future replacement to veteran Brazilian Mauro Silva; on 10 April 2002, his tackle led to a breakage in David Beckham's metatarsal in a UEFA Champions League game against Manchester United, which almost cost the English player his presence in the FIFA World Cup.

Although he fully established himself as first-choice in midfield, Duscher's contract with Depor expired in 2007, and he eventually signed in July for Racing de Santander, where he was a key member on a side that obtained a first-ever qualification to the UEFA Cup in the 2007–08 campaign. On 9 December 2007, during a 3–1 home win against RCD Mallorca, he scored his first goal in the Spanish top division, in what was then his eighth season.

In August 2008, Duscher agreed to a three-year contract at Sevilla FC. He scored his first goal for the Andalusians on 4 February 2009, in the first leg of the semi-finals of the Copa del Rey, a 2–1 home win against Athletic Bilbao (eventually 2–4 aggregate loss).

In 2009–10, Sevilla finished fourth and returned to the Champions League, but Duscher only appeared in ten games (three complete). Subsequently, he terminated his contract and signed with fellow league side RCD Espanyol, for one year.

In late July 2011, Duscher joined Barcelona S.C. from Ecuador on a one-year loan. The following summer, after being released by Espanyol, he signed for Enosis Neon Paralimni FC in the Cypriot First Division, where he stayed for only three months.

In early February 2013, Duscher joined Veria F.C. in Greece. He retired shortly after at the age of 34, however, after failing to appear officially for the club.

International career
Duscher was capped three times for the Argentina national team, all appearances coming in 2005.

References

External links

Career details at Irish Times

1979 births
Living people
People from Esquel
Argentine people of Austrian descent
Austrian people of Argentine descent
Naturalised citizens of Austria
Argentine footballers
Association football midfielders
Argentine Primera División players
Newell's Old Boys footballers
Primeira Liga players
Sporting CP footballers
La Liga players
Deportivo de La Coruña players
Racing de Santander players
Sevilla FC players
RCD Espanyol footballers
Ecuadorian Serie A players
Barcelona S.C. footballers
Cypriot First Division players
Enosis Neon Paralimni FC players
Veria F.C. players
Argentina youth international footballers
Argentina under-20 international footballers
Argentina international footballers
Argentine expatriate footballers
Expatriate footballers in Portugal
Expatriate footballers in Spain
Expatriate footballers in Ecuador
Expatriate footballers in Cyprus
Expatriate footballers in Greece
Argentine expatriate sportspeople in Portugal
Argentine expatriate sportspeople in Spain
Argentine expatriate sportspeople in Ecuador
Argentine expatriate sportspeople in Greece
Argentine expatriate sportspeople in Cyprus